The 2017 Korea Masters Grand Prix Gold was a badminton tournament which took place at Yeomju Gymnasium in South Korea from 28 November to 3 December 2017 and had a total purse of $120,000.

Tournament
The 2017 Korea Masters Grand Prix Gold was the eighteenth Grand Prix's badminton tournament of the 2017 BWF Grand Prix Gold and Grand Prix and also part of the Korea Masters championships which had been held since 2007. This tournament was organized by the Badminton Korea Association, with the sanction from the BWF.

Venue
This international tournament was held at Yeomju Gymnasium in Gwangju, South Korea.

Point distribution
Below is the tables with the point distribution for each phase of the tournament based on the BWF points system for the Grand Prix Gold event.

Prize money
The total prize money for this tournament was US$120,000. Distribution of prize money was in accordance with BWF regulations.

Men's singles

Seeds

 Son Wan-ho (third round)
 Wang Tzu-wei (first round)
 Tanongsak Saensomboonsuk (second round)
 Jeon Hyeok-jin (champion)
 Brice Leverdez (quarterfinals)
 Hsu Jen-hao (second round)
 Khosit Phetpradab (semifinals)
 Zhao Junpeng (withdrew)
 Chong Wei Feng (third round)
 Kashyap Parupalli (withdrew)
 Lee Dong-keun (semifinals)
 Zulfadli Zulkiffli (withdrew)
 Suppanyu Avihingsanon (first round)
 Lee Zii Jia (withdrew)
 Pannawit Thongnuam (second round)
 Ihsan Maulana Mustofa (third round)

Finals

Top half

Section 1

Section 2

Section 3

Section 4

Bottom half

Section 5

Section 6

Section 7

Section 8

Women's singles

Seeds

 Sung Ji-hyun (quarterfinals)
 Nitchaon Jindapol (semifinals)
 Chen Xiaoxin (withdrew)
 Busanan Ongbumrungpan (first round)
 Lee Jang-mi (final)
 Fitriani (first round)
 Michelle Li (second round)
 Pornpawee Chochuwong (quarterfinals)

Finals

Top half

Section 1

Section 2

Bottom half

Section 3

Section 4

Men's doubles

Seeds

 Lee Jhe-huei / Lee Yang (first round)
 Lu Ching-yao / Yang Po-han (quarterfinals)
 Liao Min-chun / Su Cheng-heng (semifinals)
 Marcus Ellis / Chris Langridge (withdrew)
 Bodin Isara / Nipitphon Phuangphuapet (quarterfinals)
 Hsu Jen-hao / Wang Chi-lin (first round)
 Chooi Kah Ming / Low Juan Shen (first round)
 Chung Eui-seok / Kim Duk-young (quarterfinals)

Finals

Top half

Section 1

Section 2

Bottom half

Section 3

Section 4

Women's doubles

Seeds

 Jongkolphan Kititharakul / Rawinda Prajongjai (second round)
 Anggia Shitta Awanda / Ni Ketut Mahadewi Istirani (quarterfinals)
 Hsu Ya-ching / Wu Ti-jung (first round)
 Lim Yin Loo / Yap Cheng Wen (second round)

Finals

Top half

Section 1

Section 2

Bottom half

Section 3

Section 4

Mixed doubles

Seeds

 Choi Sol-gyu / Chae Yoo-jung (final)
 Terry Hee Yong Kai / Tan Wei Han (quarterfinals)
 Wang Chi-lin / Lee Chia-hsin (second round)
 Seo Seung-jae / Kim Ha-na (champions)
 Liao Min-chun / Chen Hsiao-huan (second round)
 Bodin Isara / Savitree Amitrapai (first round)
 Kim Won-ho / Shin Seung-chan (semifinals)
 Ko Sung-hyun / Ko Hye-ryeon (first round)

Finals

Top half

Section 1

Section 2

Bottom half

Section 3

Section 4

References

External links
 Official site
 Tournament link

Korea Masters
Korea
Masters Grand Prix Gold
Korea Masters Grand Prix Gold
Korea Masters Grand Prix Gold
Korea Masters Grand Prix Gold